This is a list of the 73 Members of Parliament (MPs) elected to the House of Commons of the United Kingdom by London constituencies for the Fifty-Eighth Parliament of the United Kingdom (2019 to present) at the 2019 United Kingdom general election.

Composition at election

Current composition

List

By-elections 

 2021 Old Bexley and Sidcup by-election, Louie French, Conservative

See also 

 Lists of MPs for constituencies in London

Lists of UK MPs 2019–present
2019 United Kingdom general election